Massi may refer to:

 Massi, Benin
 Massi (surname), a surname

See also

 Masi (disambiguation)
 Masse (disambiguation)
 Massey (disambiguation)
 Massie (disambiguation)
 Massih
 Massy (disambiguation)
 Messi